The Poland men's national 3x3 team is a national basketball team of Poland, administered by the Polski Zwiazek Koszykówki.
It represents the country in international 3x3 (3 against 3) basketball competitions.

Senior Competitions

Summer Olympics

World Cup

Europe Championships

Current roster

|}
| valign="top" |
 Head coach
Piotr Renkiel
 Assistant coach

Legend
(C) Team captain
Age – describes ageon 5 September 2015
|}

Youth Competitions

Youth Olympic Games

Youth World Championships

See also
Poland men's national basketball team
Poland women's national 3x3 team

References

External links

3
Men's national 3x3 basketball teams